Méditerranée  was a department of the First French Empire in present-day Italy. It was named after the Mediterranean Sea. It was formed in 1808, when the Kingdom of Etruria (formerly the Grand Duchy of Tuscany) was annexed directly to France. Its capital was Livorno. 

The department was disbanded after the defeat of Napoleon in 1814. At the Congress of Vienna, the Grand Duchy of Tuscany was restored to its previous Habsburg-Lorraine prince, Ferdinand III. Its territory is now divided between the Italian provinces of Livorno, Pisa, Florence and Siena.

Subdivisions
The department was subdivided into the following arrondissements and cantons (situation in 1812):

 Livorno, cantons: Fauglia, Lari, Livorno (4 cantons), San Miniato, Peccioli, Pontedera and Rosignano.
 Elba island, cantons: Portoferraio (sous-préfecture) and Porto Longone.
 Pisa, cantons: Bagni di San Giuliano, Barga, Bientina, Borgo a Buggiano, Cascina, Castelfranco di Sotto, Cerreto, Fucecchio, Montecarlo, Montecatini, Pescia, Pietrasanta, Pisa (3 cantons), Seravezza and Vicopisano.
 Volterra, cantons: Campiglia, Castelfiorentino, San Gimignano, Guardistallo, Montaione, Palaia, Pomarance and Volterra.

Its population in 1812 was 318,725, and its area was 491,000 hectares. 

Elba was, from 1808 to 1811 a separate entity, ruled by a Commissaire général.

See also
Tuscany
History of Tuscany
Rulers of Tuscany
First French Empire
Grand Duchy of Tuscany
House of Bourbon-Parma
House of Habsburg-Lorraine
Kingdom of Etruria
Medici Family

References

Former departments of France in Italy
History of Pisa
History of Tuscany
1808 establishments in the First French Empire
1808 establishments in Italy
1814 disestablishments in Italy
1800s in the Grand Duchy of Tuscany
1810s in the Grand Duchy of Tuscany